

Winners and nominees

1990s

2000s

2010s

2020s

Records 
 Most awarded actress: Patricia Navidad, Marisol del Olmo and Susana González 2 times.
 Most nominated actress: Patricia Navidad and Eugenia Cauduro with 3 nominations.
 Most nominated actress without a win: Eugenia Cauduro with 3 nominations.
 Youngest winners: Mariana Levy and Violeta Isfel, 24 years old.
 Youngest nominee: Andrea Legarreta, 20 years old.
 Oldest winner: Diana Bracho, 73 years old.
 Oldest nominee: Diana Bracho, 73 years old.
 Actress winning after short time: Susana González by (La sombra del pasado, 2016) and (La candidata, 2017), 2 consecutive years.
 Actress winning after long time: Patricia Navidad by (El Manantial, 2002) and (Por Ella Soy Eva, 2013), 11 years difference.
 Actresses winning this category, despite having been as a main villain:
 Violeta Isfel (Atrévete a soñar, 2010)
 Susana González (La candidata, 2017)
 Actress was nominated in this category, despite having played as a main villain:
Andrea Legarreta (Alcanzar una estrella, 1991)
 Martha Julia (Destilando Amor, 2008)
 Chantal Andere (Antes muerta que Lichita, 2016)
 Ilse Salas (El hotel de los secretos, 2017)
 Foreign winning actresses:
 Macarena Achaga from Argentina

References

External links 
TVyNovelas at esmas.com
TVyNovelas Awards at the univision.com

Co-lead
Award for Co-lead
Award for Co-lead
Awards for actresses